Walter John Forbes Robberds (1863–1944) was a Scottish Anglican bishop.

Life and ministry 
He was born on 6 September 1863 in Baharampur. He was educated at Trinity College, Glenalmond, and Keble College, Oxford. He was ordained deacon after studying at Ripon College Cuddesdon in 1887 in Gloucester and priest in 1888 in Bristol. His career began as a curate at St Mary Redcliffe, Bristol after which he was Chaplain of his old theological college. He then held incumbencies at St German's, Blackheath St Mary's, Arbroath and St Mary Redcliffe where additionally he was also Rural Dean of Bedminster. In 1904 he was ordained to the episcopate as the Bishop of Brechin Four years later he became Primus of Scotland, a post he held until his retirement in 1934. He died on 16 August 1944.

References

1863 births
People from West Bengal
People educated at Glenalmond College
Alumni of Keble College, Oxford
Alumni of Ripon College Cuddesdon
Bishops of Brechin (Episcopalian)
20th-century Scottish Episcopalian bishops
20th-century Anglican archbishops
Primuses of the Scottish Episcopal Church
1944 deaths